Kastrioti Stadium is a multi-use stadium in Krujë, Albania.  It is currently used mostly for football matches and is the home ground of Kastrioti Krujë.

References

KS Kastrioti
Football venues in Albania
Buildings and structures in Krujë